The 2020–21 Women's National Cricket League season was the 25th season of the Women's National Cricket League (WNCL), the women's domestic limited overs cricket competition in Australia. The tournament started on 30 January 2021 and finished on 27 March 2021. Defending champions Western Australia finished bottom of the ladder, while 20-time winners New South Wales Breakers missed out on the final for the first time. Victoria finished top of the ladder and met Queensland Fire in the final, where the latter won by 112 runs to secure their first WNCL title.

Ladder

Fixtures

Final

Statistics

Highest totals

Most runs

Most wickets

References

Notes

Bibliography

External links
 WNCL 2020–21 on cricket.com.au
 Series home at ESPNcricinfo

 
Women's National Cricket League seasons
 
Women's National Cricket League